Arnold Susi (4 January 1896 – 29 May 1968) was a lawyer and the Minister of Education in the Estonian government of Otto Tief established on 18 September 1944 during WWII.

In 1945, Susi befriended Aleksandr Solzhenitsyn in a Soviet prison. In the 1960s, when writing The Gulag Archipelago Solzhenitsyn hid at Susi's country house in Estonia. Solzhenitsyn also briefly describes his meeting with Arnold Susi in that book.
Susi also wrote his memoirs of World War I in Doom of the Russian Empire (in Estonian: Vene impeeriumi hukk), which he wrote while in Abakan. He died in Tallinn, aged 72.

In 2019, the Estonian Ministry of Justice created the Heli and Arnold Susi Mission Award for the Courage to Speak Out, which recognizes individuals who have dared to use the power of their words to stand up for democratic values and human rights.

References

1896 births
1968 deaths
People from Uspensky District
People from Kuban Oblast
Government ministers of Estonia
20th-century Estonian lawyers
Estonian anti-communists
Gulag detainees
Prisoners and detainees of the Soviet Union
20th-century Estonian politicians